Plesioteuthis is an extinct genus of squids, belonging to the family Plesioteuthididae. This genus was first described in 1859, and its fossils were found in the well-known Solnhofen field in Germany.

Species
Species within this genus include:
Plesioteuthis prisca (the type species) (Rueppel, 1829) †
Plesioteuthis subovata (G.G. Münster, 1846 ) †

The Plesioteuthis arcuata is not considered a member of this genus. Together with its close relatives (including Rhomboteuthis, Dorateuthis and Boreopeltis) this animal has often been considered an archaic relative of the octopus (Octopodiformes) due to the fact that more than eight tentacles have never been found in fossils. However, the structure of the beak of Plesioteuthis resembles that of the Decapodiformes.

Fossil record

These squids lived in the Tithonian, Upper Jurassic (Age range from 155.7 to 150.8  million years ago) and their fossils were found in Germany.

Description
These animals were very similar to the current cuttlefish, but they had a thinner stream-lined body of considerable size.

In fossils usually the gladius is crushed or flattened, so as to hide the small stabilizers present towards the back. Traces of the tentacles are often preserved. 

Next to them sometimes there are traces of the beak and mouth. Some phosphatizations of the soft parts preserve the strong striations on the gladius, on the back of the animal.

In the middle of the body there was an organ similar to a button, often preserved in a darker color than the rest of the fossil. This structure was the ink-sack.

Biology
They were fast-moving nektonic carnivores living in lagoons, in shallow subtidal water and reefs.

Bibliography
 Fuchs, D., Klinghammer, A., & Keupp, H. 2007. [file:///C:/Users/ebalo/AppData/Local/Packages/Microsoft.MicrosoftEdge_8wekyb3d8bbwe/TempState/Downloads/njgpa_Band_245_Heft_2_p239-252_Taxonomy_morphology_and_phylogeny_of_plesioteuthidid_coleoids_from_the_Upper_Jurassic_Tith%20(1).pdf  Taxonomy, morphology and phylogeny of plesioteuthidid coleoids from the Upper Jurassic (Tithonian) Plattenkalks of Solnhofen.] Neues Jahrbuch für Geologie und Paläontologie, Abhandlungen 245(2): 239-252.
Klug, C; Schweigert, G; Dietl, G (2010). A new Plesioteuthis with beak from the Kimmeridgian of Nusplingen (Germany). Ferrantia, 59:73-77.

References 

Note: This article has been expanded using material based on a translation of an article from the Italian Wikipedia.
prisca
Cephalopod genera